Alstonia longifolia is a plant species in the genus Alstonia, family Apocynaceae. It is native to southern Mexico and Guatemala at an elevation of 1400–1800 m.

This is a tree up to 11 m (33 feet) tall. It is distinguished from related species by its corolla tube 7–10 mm long, with obovate lobes 4–6 mm x 2–3 mm.

References

longifolia
Trees of Mexico
Trees of Central America
Cloud forest flora of Mexico